Ban Saeo is a village and tambon (subdistrict) of Chiang Saen District, in Chiang Rai Province, Thailand. In 2005 it had a population of 11,444 people. The tambon contains 15 villages.

References

Tambon of Chiang Rai province
Populated places in Chiang Rai province